Mount Rea; Sarnoff Mountains, Ford Ranges, Marie Byrd Land, Antarctica. A prominent mountain with an imposing monolith on its west side called the Billboard, standing between Arthur Glacier and Boyd Glacier. It is composed of Byrd Coast granite of Cretaceous age, and reaches an elevation of 760 m. It was discovered by the Byrd Antarctic Expedition on the Eastern Flight of December 5, 1929, and named by Byrd for Mr. and Mrs. Rea, of Pittsburgh, Pennsylvania, contributors to the expedition.

References

Mountains of Antarctica
Rea, Mount